Ptychospermatinae is a palm tree subtribe in the tribe Areceae.

Genera:
Adonidia
Balaka
Brassiophoenix
Carpentaria
Drymophloeus
Jailoloa
Manjekia
Normanbya
Ponapea
Ptychococcus
Ptychosperma
Solfia
Veitchia
Wallaceodoxa
Wodyetia

References

External links

 
Arecaceae subtribes